Built on Glass is the debut studio album by Australian electronic musician Chet Faker. It was released on 11 April 2014 on the Future Classic label to generally favourable reviews.

At the J Awards of 2014, the album won Australian Album of the Year.

Critical reception

Built on Glass received generally positive reviews from music critics. At Metacritic, which assigns a normalised rating out of 100 to reviews from mainstream critics, the album holds an average score of 75, indicating "generally favorable reviews".

Track listing

Personnel 
Credits adapted from booklet.

Performance
 Nick Murphy – performer
 CLEOPOLD – guitar solo 

Visuals and imagery
 Tin and Ed – art direction, photography

Technical and production
 Nick Murphy – production, recording
 Eric J Dubowsky – mixing
 Brian Lucey – mastering

Tours

Built on Glass Tour

National tour 

Festivals and other miscellaneous performances
These concerts were a part of the "Perth International Arts Festival"

Cancellations and rescheduled shows

Built on Live tour

Charts and certifications

Weekly charts

Year-end charts

Certifications

Release history

References 

2014 debut albums
ARIA Award-winning albums
Chet Faker albums
Contemporary R&B albums by Australian artists